Angadpura, chak 520, is a small village situated nearby Gogera Branch Canal in Toba Tek Singh District. It is between Gojra city and Toba Tek Singh city. It was rehabilitated by the government with migrators who moved from Nasarke Batala.

Information
100 percent of the people are Muslim. Two Mosques and two government schools are in Angadpura.

History 
The village is an agricultural land.

External links
 wikimapia

Populated places in Toba Tek Singh District